Sphenomorphus schlegeli  is a species of skink found in Indonesia.

References

schlegeli
Reptiles described in 1927
Taxa named by Emmett Reid Dunn
Fauna of the Lesser Sunda Islands